The municipality of Tomás Gomensoro is one of the three municipalities of Artigas Department. Its seat is the city of Tomás Gomensoro.

Location 
The municipality is located in the northeast section of Artigas Department, east to the municipality of Bella Unión and north to the municipality of Baltasar Brum.

History 
The Municipality was created by Law N° 18653 of 15 March 2020, in compliance with the provisions of the Law N° 18567 that provided for the creation of municipalities over all settlements with 2000 or more inhabitants. It is part of the Artigas Department and comprises the ICC electoral district or constituency of the department.

Settlements 
The only settlement of the municipality is the city of Tomás Gomensoro.

Authorities 
The authority of the municipality is the Municipal Council, integrated by the Mayor (who presides it) and four Councilors.

References 

Tomás Gomensoro